Ceratodontiformes is an order of lungfish that is defined as "the clade including all taxa more closely related to Lepidosiren, Neoceratodus and Gnathorhiza than to Uronemus, Conchopoma and Sagenodus". Members of this suborder are known as ceratodontoids. The only presently extant lungfish in the families Neoceratodontidae, Lepidosirenidae, and Protopteridae belong to this suborder.

Taxonomy 
The suborder was formerly defined as being within the order Ceratodontiformes and including the families Neoceratodontidae and Ceratodontidae, as they were formerly thought to be closely related to one another. However, phylogenetic analyses indicate that this classification is paraphyletic, as Ceratodontidae was found to be a sister group to a clade containing Lepidosirenidae, which was formerly classified as Lepidosireniformes, a distinct order from Ceratodontiformes. Due to this, Lepidosireniformes and Ceratodontiformes were redefined as families within the order Ceratodontiformes, redefined as including all lungfish more closely allied with Neoceratodontidae and Lepidosirenidae.

The current taxa within the suborder are listed below, taxonomy based on Kemp et al (2017):

The oldest fossils from this suborder are of Gnathorhizidae from the Late Carboniferous. Phylogenetic evidence indicates that the suborder itself originated slightly earlier in the late Carboniferous and rapidly diversified into the multiple families between then and the start of the Permian.

References 

Lungfish
Extant Pennsylvanian first appearances
Fish suborders